The Carrizo-Wilcox Aquifer is an aquifer in Texas, United States.

The aquifer supplies water to about 12 million homes in East Texas.

The aquifer's water quality is claimed to be at risk from leaks and spills from the Keystone XL tar sands pipeline by extremist environmental organizations.  In 2012, the Tar Sands Blockade mounted a campaign of peaceful and sustained civil disobedience justified by the groups claim that they are protecting the water quality of the aquifer by stopping the pipeline.

References

Aquifers in the United States
Geology of Texas